Muscle hypertrophy or muscle building involves a hypertrophy or increase in size of skeletal muscle through a growth in size of its component cells. Two factors contribute to hypertrophy: sarcoplasmic hypertrophy, which focuses more on increased muscle glycogen storage; and myofibrillar hypertrophy, which focuses more on increased myofibril size. It is the most major part of the bodybuilding-related activities.

Hypertrophy stimulation
A range of stimuli can increase the volume of muscle cells. These changes occur as an adaptive response that serves to increase the ability to generate force or resist fatigue in anaerobic conditions.

Strength training

Strength training (resistance training) causes neural and muscular adaptations which increase the capacity of an athlete to exert force through voluntary muscular contraction: After an initial period of neuro-muscular adaptation, the muscle tissue expands by creating sarcomeres (contractile elements) and increasing non-contractile elements like sarcoplasmic fluid.

Muscular hypertrophy can be induced by progressive overload (a strategy of progressively increasing resistance or repetitions over successive bouts of exercise to maintain a high level of effort).  However, the precise mechanisms are not clearly understood; currently accepted hypotheses involve some combination of mechanical tension, metabolic fatigue, and muscular damage.

Muscular hypertrophy plays an important role in competitive bodybuilding and strength sports like powerlifting, football, and Olympic weightlifting.

Anaerobic training

The best approach to specifically achieve muscle growth remains controversial (as opposed to focusing on gaining strength, power, or endurance); it was generally considered that consistent anaerobic strength training will produce hypertrophy over the long term, in addition to its effects on muscular strength and endurance. Muscular hypertrophy can be increased through strength training and other short-duration, high-intensity anaerobic exercises. Lower-intensity, longer-duration aerobic exercise generally does not result in very effective tissue hypertrophy; instead, endurance athletes enhance storage of fats and carbohydrates within the muscles, as well as neovascularization.

Temporary swelling

During a workout, increased blood flow to metabolically active areas causes muscles to temporarily increase in size. This phenomenon is referred to as transient hypertrophy, or more commonly known as being "pumped up" or getting "a pump." About two hours after a workout and typically for seven to eleven days, muscles swell due to an inflammation response as tissue damage is repaired. Longer-term hypertrophy occurs due to more permanent changes in muscle structure.

Factors affecting hypertrophy
Biological factors (such as DNA and sex), nutrition, and training variables can affect muscle hypertrophy.

Individual differences in genetics account for a substantial portion of the variance in existing muscle mass. A classical twin study design (similar to those of behavioral genetics) estimated that about 53% of the variance in lean body mass is heritable, along with about 45% of the variance in muscle fiber proportion.

During puberty in males, hypertrophy occurs at an increased rate. Natural hypertrophy normally stops at full growth in the late teens. As testosterone is one of the body's major growth hormones, on average, males find hypertrophy much easier (on an absolute scale) to achieve than females, and, on average, have about 60% more muscle mass than women. Taking additional testosterone, as in anabolic steroids, will increase results. It is also considered a performance-enhancing drug, the use of which can cause competitors to be suspended or banned from competitions. Testosterone is also a medically regulated substance in most countries, making it illegal to possess without a medical prescription. Anabolic steroid use can cause testicular atrophy, cardiac arrest, and gynecomastia.

In the long term, a positive energy balance, when more calories are consumed rather than burned, is helpful for anabolism and therefore muscle hypertrophy. An increased requirement for protein can help elevate protein synthesis, which is seen in athletes training for muscle hypertrophy. However, there is no scientific consensus on whether strength-training athletes have increased protein requirements.

Training variables, in the context of strength training, such as frequency, intensity, and total volume also directly affect the increase of muscle hypertrophy. A gradual increase in all of these training variables will yield muscular hypertrophy.

Changes in protein synthesis and muscle cell biology associated with stimuli

Protein synthesis

The message filters down to alter the pattern of gene expression. The additional contractile proteins appear to be incorporated into existing myofibrils (the chains of sarcomeres within a muscle cell). There appears to be some limit to how large a myofibril can become: at some point, they split. These events appear to occur within each muscle fiber. That is hypertrophy results primarily from the growth of each muscle cell rather than an increase in the number of cells. Skeletal muscle cells are however unique in the body in that they can contain multiple nuclei, and the number of nuclei can increase.

Cortisol decreases amino acid uptake by muscle tissue, and inhibits protein synthesis. The short-term increase in protein synthesis that occurs subsequent to resistance training returns to normal after approximately 28 hours in adequately fed male youths. Another study determined that muscle protein synthesis was elevated even 72 hours following training.

A small study performed on young and elderly found that ingestion of 340 grams of lean beef (90 g protein) did not increase muscle protein synthesis any more than ingestion of 113 grams of lean beef (30 g protein). In both groups, muscle protein synthesis increased by 50%. The study concluded that more than 30 g protein in a single meal did not further enhance the stimulation of muscle protein synthesis in young and elderly. However, this study didn't check protein synthesis in relation to training; therefore conclusions from this research are controversial. A 2018 review of the scientific literature concluded that for the purpose of building lean muscle tissue, a minimum of 1.6 g protein per kilogram of body weight is required, which can for example be divided over 4 meals or snacks and spread out over the day.

It is not uncommon for bodybuilders to advise a protein intake as high as 2–4 g per kilogram of bodyweight per day. However, scientific literature has suggested this is higher than necessary, as protein intakes greater than 1.8 g per kilogram of body weight showed to have no greater effect on muscle hypertrophy. A study carried out by American College of Sports Medicine (2002) put the recommended daily protein intake for athletes at 1.2–1.8 g per kilogram of body weight. Conversely, Di Pasquale (2008), citing recent studies, recommends a minimum protein intake of 2.2 g/kg "for anyone involved in competitive or intense recreational sports who wants to maximize lean body mass but does not wish to gain weight. However athletes involved in strength events (..) may need even more to maximize body composition and athletic performance. In those attempting to minimize body fat and thus maximize body composition, for example in sports with weight classes and in bodybuilding, it's possible that protein may well make up over 50% of their daily caloric intake."

Microtrauma

Microtrauma is tiny damage to the muscle fibers. The precise relation between microtrauma and muscle growth is not entirely understood yet.

One theory is that microtrauma plays a significant role in muscle growth. When microtrauma occurs (from weight training or other strenuous activities), the body responds by overcompensating, replacing the damaged tissue and adding more, so that the risk of repeat damage is reduced. Damage to these fibers has been theorized as the possible cause for the symptoms of delayed onset muscle soreness (DOMS), and is why progressive overload is essential to continued improvement, as the body adapts and becomes more resistant to stress.

However, other work examining the time course of changes in muscle protein synthesis and their relationship to hypertrophy showed that damage was unrelated to hypertrophy. In fact, in one study the authors showed that it was not until the damage subsided that protein synthesis was directed to muscle growth.

Myofibrillar vs. sarcoplasmic hypertrophy

In the bodybuilding and fitness community and even in some academic books skeletal muscle hypertrophy is described as being in one of two types: Sarcoplasmic or myofibrillar. According to this hypothesis, during sarcoplasmic hypertrophy, the volume of sarcoplasmic fluid in the muscle cell increases with no accompanying increase in muscular strength, whereas during myofibrillar hypertrophy, actin and myosin contractile proteins increase in number and add to muscular strength as well as a small increase in the size of the muscle. Sarcoplasmic hypertrophy is greater in the muscles of bodybuilders because studies suggest sarcoplasmic hypertrophy shows a greater increase in muscle size while myofibrillar hypertrophy proves to increase overall muscular strength making it more dominant in Olympic weightlifters. These two forms of adaptations rarely occur completely independently of one another; one can experience a large increase in fluid with a slight increase in proteins, a large increase in proteins with a small increase in fluid, or a relatively balanced combination of the two.

In sports
Examples of increased muscle hypertrophy are seen in various professional sports, mainly strength related sports such as boxing, olympic weightlifting, mixed martial arts, rugby, professional wrestling and various forms of gymnastics. Athletes in other more skill-based sports such as basketball, baseball, ice hockey, and football may also train for increased muscle hypertrophy to better suit their position of play. For example, a center (basketball) may want to be bigger and more muscular to better overpower his or her opponents in the low post. Athletes training for these sports train extensively not only in strength but also in cardiovascular and muscular endurance training.

See also 

 Anabolism
 Colorado Experiment
 Davis' law
 Follistatin
 Lean body mass
 Muscle atrophy
 Muscle dystrophy
 Myostatin
 Pseudohypertrophy

References

Further reading 

 
 
 
 
 
 
 

Muscular system
Tissues (biology)
Physiology
Exercise physiology
Bodybuilding